ORCA Grants are grants from the Office of Research and Creative Activities (ORCA) at Brigham Young University (BYU) to encourage and facilitate undergraduate mentored research for all fields of study at BYU.

The ORAC Grant funds comes from both private and university donors (e.g., BYU Alumni Association). Several hundred grants are offered each year and approximately one-third of the applicants are awarded them. Each ORCA Grant provides $1,500 to the student recipient and $300 to the mentor. In the 2011–2012 academic year, BYU awarded $427,500 to 285 undergraduates whose research proposals merited grants.

All ORCA Grant recipients are required to submit a report at the project's conclusion, which is published in the Journal of Undergraduate Research. Additionally, most students go on to publish ORCA Grant-related research in professional academic journals.

External links
 ORCA Grant
 Office of Research & Creative Activities
 Brigham Young University

References

Brigham Young University
Grants (money)